Magundy is a community in the Canadian province of New Brunswick. It is located 23 mi SW of Fredericton on Route 635.

History

Land Petition 1821 McGundy Ridge; Land Petition 1823 Magundy Ridge; Magundy in 1841 Ward. Settled c1820 from Ireland. Alan Rayburn, Geographic Names of New Brunswick. Ottawa 1972.

Notable people

See also
List of communities in New Brunswick

References

Communities in York County, New Brunswick